Elwesia is a genus of moths of the family Noctuidae.

Species
 Elwesia diplostigma Hampson, 1894
 Elwesia nigripalpis Warren, 1911
 Elwesia pallida Warren, 1911

References
Natural History Museum Lepidoptera genus database
Elwesia at funet

Cuculliinae